Sir Terence Garvey KCMG (7 December 1915 – 7 December 1986) was a British diplomat who was High Commissioner to India and Ambassador to the USSR.

Career
Terence Willcocks Garvey was educated at Felsted School and University College, Oxford (where he gained a first class degree in Philosophy, Politics and Economics), and was a Laming Fellow at The Queen's College, Oxford, in 1938. In the same year he joined Her Majesty's Diplomatic Service. He served in the USA, Chile, Germany and Egypt as well as at the Foreign Office. He was Counsellor, HM Embassy, Belgrade, 1958–62; chargé d'affaires at Peking, and concurrently Britain's first ambassador to Mongolia, 1963–65; assistant Under-secretary of State at the Foreign Office 1965–68; ambassador to Yugoslavia 1968–71; High Commissioner to India 1971–73; and ambassador to the Soviet Union 1973–75.

After retiring from the Diplomatic Service Garvey became a Senior Associate Member of St Antony's College, Oxford. He is buried at Murrisk Abbey, county Mayo, Ireland.

Honours
Terence Garvey was appointed CMG in the Queen's Birthday Honours of 1955 and knighted KCMG in the New Year Honours of 1969.

Publications
Bones of Contention: An Enquiry Into East-West Relations, Routledge & Kegan Paul, London, 1978,

Offices held

References
GARVEY, Sir Terence Willcocks, Who Was Who, A & C Black, 1920–2008; online edn, Oxford University Press, Dec 2012, accessed 7 April 2013
Sir Terence Garvey (obituary), The Times, London, 9 December 1986

1915 births
1986 deaths
People educated at Felsted School
Alumni of University College, Oxford
Fellows of The Queen's College, Oxford
St Antony's College, Oxford
Ambassadors of the United Kingdom to Mongolia
Ambassadors of the United Kingdom to Yugoslavia
High Commissioners of the United Kingdom to India
Ambassadors of the United Kingdom to the Soviet Union
Knights Commander of the Order of St Michael and St George